Mohamed Youla (born 9 July 1996) is a Guinean professional footballer who plays as a midfielder for Championnat National 3 club Avoine OCC.

External links 
 
 

1996 births
Living people
Guinean footballers
Association football midfielders
AS Kaloum Star players
Olympique Saumur FC players
Avoine OCC players
Guinea international footballers
Championnat National 3 players
Guinea A' international footballers
2016 African Nations Championship players
Guinean expatriate footballers
Expatriate footballers in France
Guinean expatriate sportspeople in France